En Concierto (released in the United States as In Concert) is a 1983 album by Julio Iglesias.

Certification

References

1983 live albums
Julio Iglesias albums
Spanish-language live albums